Liocrobyla paraschista is a moth of the family Gracillariidae. It is known from Fiji, India (Bihar and Karnataka) and Japan (Hokkaidō, Honshū and Kyūshū) and Korea.

The wingspan is 6–7 mm. There are three generations per year. The larvae of the first generation occur from the end of June to the beginning of July, and the adults are on wing from the end of July to the beginning of August. The larvae of the second generation are found from the end of August to the middle of September, and produce
adults at the end of September. The larvae of the third generation appear in October. These larvae hibernate in their cocoons. Pupation takes place in May, and the adults appear between the end of May and the beginning of June.

The larvae feed on Butea monosperma, Cajanus cajan, Desmodium caudatum, Desmodium gangeticum, Desmodium oldhamii, Desmodium podocarpum, Flemingia lineata, Lespedeza cyrtobotrya and Millettia species. They mine the leaves of their host plant. Young larvae are of the sap-feeding kind. After hatching they mine in the lower epidermis of the leaf. When the larva changes into a tissue-feeder, it feeds in the palisade parenchyma. An oblique pore is made in the lower surface, through which frass is ejected. The mine has the form of a digitate blotch under the upper epidermis along the midrib or lateral rib. It is pale green or pale greenish brown with a pale brownish patch in the middle.

References

Gracillariinae
Moths of Asia
Moths described in 1916